2391 Tomita, provisional designation , is a Nysian asteroid from the inner regions of the asteroid belt, approximately 15 kilometers in diameter. The asteroid was discovered on 9 January 1957, by German astronomer Karl Reinmuth at Heidelberg Observatory in southern Germany. It was named after Japanese astronomer Kōichirō Tomita.

Orbit and classification 

Tomita is a member of the Nysa family, which is named after its most massive member 44 Nysa. It orbits the Sun in the inner main-belt at a distance of 2.1–2.8 AU once every 3 years and 10 months (1,393 days). Its orbit has an eccentricity of 0.13 and an inclination of 3° with respect to the ecliptic.

A first precovery was taken at Lowell Observatory in 1929, extending the body's observation arc by 28 years prior to its official discovery observation at Heidelberg.

Physical characteristics 

Tomita has been characterized as a stony S-type asteroid by the Collaborative Asteroid Lightcurve Link (CALL), and as a carbonaceous C-type asteroid by Pan-STARRS photometric survey.

Diameter and albedo 

According to the surveys carried out by NASA's Wide-field Infrared Survey Explorer with its subsequent NEOWISE mission, the asteroid measures between 15.07 and 19.4 kilometers in diameter and its surface has a low albedo between 0.03 and 0.07, respectively.

As CALL considers the body to be of a stony composition, it assumes a much higher albedo of 0.21 and calculates a diameter of 9.2 kilometers, as the higher the asteroid's reflectivity (albedo), the shorter its diameter at a constant absolute magnitude (brightness).

Rotation period 

In December 2013, two rotational lightcurves were obtained for this asteroid from photometric observations.

Naming 

This minor planet was named in honor of Japanese astronomer Kōichirō Tomita (1925–2006), long-time observer at the Tokyo Astronomical Observatory, and a discoverer of minor planets and comets himself. Tomita was also known as one of Japan's principal popularizer of astronomy. The official  was published by the Minor Planet Center on 14 April 1987.

Notes

References

External links 
 Asteroid Lightcurve Database (LCDB), query form (info )
 Dictionary of Minor Planet Names, Google books
 Asteroids and comets rotation curves, CdR – Observatoire de Genève, Raoul Behrend
 Discovery Circumstances: Numbered Minor Planets (1)-(5000) – Minor Planet Center
 
 

 

002391
Discoveries by Karl Wilhelm Reinmuth
Named minor planets
19570109